The College of Applied Science or CASVDY, is located in Vadakkencherry, Palakkad district in the Indian state of Kerala.

The college is affiliated with the University of Calicut. It is managed by the IHRD, a government of Kerala undertaking. It conducts courses in B.Sc Computer Science, B.Sc Electronics, B.Com with Computer Application, M.Sc Computer Science, M.Sc Electronics and MCA.

CASVDY is the first college in Kerala to offer a postgraduate diploma course in Audio engineering at the government level for aspirants in the audio media industry and fourth in India. The course started in June 2010.
NSS unit of IHRD was the overall champions of 2018 NSS kalotsavam.

Overview
The college was established in 1993 offering undergraduate education programs such as B.Sc. Electronics and Computer Science for the first time in Kerala. The course is being run under the semester system. The University of Calicut awards the degree. The location of the permanent building of the college is by the side of NH 47 at a distance of 33 km from both Palakkad and Thrissur. There are about 29 teaching staff, 14 in Computer Science, 10 in Electronics and 5 others.

Courses

PGDAE
IHRD is introducing a new course "Post Graduate Diploma in Audio Engineering" spanning two semesters, the first of its kind in Kerala under the government sector at the College of Applied Science, Vadakkencherry, for aspirants in the audio media industry from July 2010. The course has been formulated mainly to cater the needs of students who wish to pursue a career in Audio Engineering. A three-month internship at the  "Chithranjali Studio" would be one of the highlights of the course.

Facilities
 Computer Labs
 Electronic Labs
 Library

Aarabhi
An audio recording studio AARABHI was constructed in the campus to impart hands on training to the students.

Associations
 CASCA (Computer Science Association)
 PULSE (Electronics Association)
 VOC (Commerce Association)

The members of the association are all the students under each department. A group of executive members from each class along with a staff advisor and a chairman constitute the executive committee of each association.  A vice-chairman and a secretary are elected from the committee members.

Placement cell
Training activities are organized throughout the year to prepare students for campus selection programmes. The placement cell coordinates with the corporate sector and other similar educational institutions and enables the students to participate in campus selection events across the state. The cell provides data to the corporate sector with regard to the candidates available for consideration towards placement.

Illustrations, real time workshops, group discussions and interviews are organized. Personality Development programmes and seminars are also periodically conducted by inviting eminent personalities.

Notable people

Notable faculty
 Pradip Somasundaran

Notable alumni

References

External links
Official website
Official website of Voice of Commerce - Commerce Department
The Orkut Community of CAS VDY
Black and White Dreams - alumni site 

Arts and Science colleges in Kerala
Universities and colleges in Palakkad district
Colleges affiliated with the University of Calicut
Institute of Human Resources Development
Educational institutions established in 1993
1993 establishments in Kerala